Bally's Evansville is a casino hotel and entertainment complex in downtown Evansville, Indiana, owned by Gaming and Leisure Properties and operated by Bally's Corporation.

Originally named Casino Aztar, it was opened by Aztar Corporation in 1995 as the state's first casino. The name was changed to Tropicana Evansville in 2013. In 2017, the casino moved from its original riverboat into a land-based facility.

The main entertainment facility consists of a  casino, a 250-room hotel, a 1,660 vehicle parking garage, and pavilion housing pre-boarding facilities, retail shops, restaurants, and lounge area. A new entertainment district with a 100-room boutique hotel and additional restaurants opened in late 2006.

In 2005, the casino generated $137 million in revenue and $41 million in profits.

History
Casino Aztar was Indiana's first casino under riverboat gaming legislation passed in 1993. It opened in 1995.

The property's name was changed to Tropicana Evansville in 2013.

In 2017, the casino moved from its original riverboat into a land-based facility.

In 2018, the casino's parent company, Tropicana Entertainment sold its real estate assets, including the Tropicana Evansville, to Gaming and Leisure Properties (GLP), while Eldorado Resorts (later named Caesars Entertainment) acquired the casinos' operating businesses.

Bally's Corporation purchased the Tropicana's operating business from Caesars in 2021 for $140 million, leasing the property from GLP for $28 million per year. The property was rebranded as Bally's later that year.

Riverboat 
The casino boat, called "City of Evansville", was built by Jeffboat in Jeffersonville, Indiana. It was a replica of the historic Robert E. Lee racing sidewheel steamboat crafted nearly 130 years ago. Jeffboat deployed 200 workers and spent over twelve months constructing the vessel. The exterior was designed by RA Stern, Inc. to appear as if the boat was straight from the Civil War era; the interior, designed by Morris & Brown Architects, Ltd., was purely Las Vegas glamor.

Hotels

Tropicana Hotel 

The Tropicana Hotel opened on December 17, 1996, originally as the Casino Aztar Hotel.

Le Merigot 

Le Merigot, which opened on December 28, 2006, was designed by Los Angeles-based interior designer Laurence Lee.

Riverfront Pavilion

The District 
The Downtown Waterfront Entertainment District is a $40 million expansion, opened in 2006. The district includes a 100-room boutique hotel and a multi-venu entertainment facility centered on a riverfront park. Jillian’s Billiards Club and Ri Ra Irish Pub opened to the public on September 15, 2006. The Le Merigot Hotel and Blush Ultralounge and Tapas Bar opened on December 28, 2006. The complex is located across from the existing hotel.

Following an unsuccessful run of business by Jillian's, it has since gone out of business and was replaced by Stoney's Rockin' Country Bar in 2011. Stoney's Rockin' Country Bar went out of business in December 2012. Boogie Nights, a dance club with a 1970s and 1980s theme entered the space in 2013 along with The Sports Book Bar & Grill. The Sports Book Bar & Grill closed in December 2014 as a result of management issues. Chido Mexican Bar & Grill will open in that space in August 2015, between Boogie Nights and Ri Ra Irish Pub & Restaurant.

References

Hotel buildings completed in 1995
Casinos in Indiana
Buildings and structures in Evansville, Indiana
Tourist attractions in Evansville, Indiana
1995 establishments in Indiana